Slander: Liberal Lies About the American Right is a 2002 book by conservative columnist Ann Coulter criticizing "the left's hegemonic control of the news media". The book was a #1 New York Times best seller in 2002, holding the #1 spot for eight weeks.

Comments about the New York Times

In an interview with George Gurley of the New York Observer shortly after the publication of Slander, it was mentioned that Coulter actually had friends and acquaintances who worked for the Times, namely restaurant critic Frank Bruni and correspondent David E. Sanger. Later in the interview, she expressed amusement at her recollections of the Times''' gratuitousness in publishing two photos of George H. W. Bush throwing up at a diplomatic meeting in Japan, then said, "Is your tape recorder running? Turn it on! I got something to say...My only regret with Timothy McVeigh is he did not go to the New York Times Building." Gurley told her to be careful, to which she responded, "You’re right, after 9/11 I shouldn’t say that."

When asked by John Hawkins, the web manager of a right-wing blog, through a pre-written set of interview questions if she regretted the statement, Coulter replied by saying, "Of course I regret it. I should have added, 'after everyone had left the building except the editors and reporters.'" Lee Salem, the president of Universal Press Syndicate, which distributes Coulter's column, later defended Coulter by characterizing her comments as satire.

The subject came up again when Coulter appeared on the Fox News program Hannity & Colmes. Alan Colmes mentioned Salem's claim, and said to her that remarks like saying "Timothy McVeigh should have bombed The New York Times building" were "laughable happy satires, right?" He then said that Coulter was "actually a liberal who is doing this to mock and parody the way conservatives think." She replied, "Well, it's not working very well if that were my goal. No, I think the Timothy McVeigh line was merely prescient after The New York Times has leaped beyond — beyond nonsense straight into treason, last week". She was referring to a Times report that revealed classified information about an anti-terrorism program of the U.S. government involving surveillance of international financial transactions of persons suspected of having Al-Qaida links. Colmes continued in the same vein when he responded, calling her remarks "great humor", and that it "belongs on Saturday Night Live. It belongs on The Daily Show."

New York Times NASCAR coverage
In the first edition of this book, Coulter incorrectly alleged that The New York Times did not cover NASCAR driver Dale Earnhardt's death until two days after he died:The New York Times did, in fact, cover Earnhardt's death the same day that he died: sportswriter Robert Lipsyte authored an article for the front page that was published on February 18, 2001. Another front page article appeared in the Times on the following day. Coulter cited an article indeed written two days after Earnhardt's death—Rick Bragg, a Pulitzer Prize winner who grew up in the South, wrote a personal piece on Earnhardt and his passing—bringing the total to three days in a row in which the Times'' covered Earnhardt's death on its front page. The paper also ran a prominent story about Earnhardt before his death.

Coulter responded to this widely publicized error as follows:

Coulter corrected the error in the paperback edition of her book.

References

External links
Booknotes interview with Coulter on Slander, August 11, 2002.
Today Show interview with Coulter about Slander, July, 2002.

2002 non-fiction books
Books by Ann Coulter
Books critical of modern liberalism in the United States
Books about politics of the United States
English-language books